The 2015 St Kilda Football Club season was the 119th in the club's history. Coached by Alan Richardson and captained by Nick Riewoldt, they competed in the AFL's 2015 Toyota Premiership Season.

List changes
The following summarises all player changes between the conclusion of the 2014 season and the commencement of the 2015 season.

In:

Out:

Season summary

Pre-season matches
The first two practice matches were played as part of the 2015 NAB Challenge, and were played under modified pre-season rules, including nine-point goals. The final practice match was not part of the NAB Challenge, and was played under premiership season rules.

Premiership Season

Home and away season

Ladder

Awards, records and milestones

Awards

Records

Milestones
Round 1:
 Jack Lonie – AFL debut
 Tim Membrey – first game for St Kilda (previously Sydney Swans)
Round 2:
 Sam Fisher – 200th AFL game
Round 3:
 Patrick McCartin – AFL debut

Brownlow Medal

Results

Brownlow Medal tally

 italics denotes ineligible player

Tribunal cases

References

External links
 
 Listing of St Kilda game results in 2015

St Kilda Football Club Season, 2015
St Kilda Football Club seasons